The Manti Presbyterian Church is a historic church at 185 S. Main St. in Manti, Utah.  The Gothic Revival building was constructed in 1881 and added to the National Register of Historic Places in 1980.

The church was designed by Salt Lake City architect Peter Van Houghton at no charge.  It is a tall one-story building made of oolite stone.  It has Gothic Revival details.  It has a gable roof and a stone tower surmounted by a wooden belfry.

References

Churches completed in 1881
Gothic Revival church buildings in Utah
Presbyterian churches in Utah
Churches on the National Register of Historic Places in Utah
Buildings and structures in Sanpete County, Utah
National Register of Historic Places in Sanpete County, Utah
1881 establishments in Utah Territory